Robert Hovanec (born September 29, 1993) is an American sprinter athlete who competed in the 400m. He attended the University of Connecticut competing for the UConn Huskies in the American Athletic Conference. He attended high school at Watchung Hills Regional High School.

Hovanec is the 2012 New Balance Indoor Nationals 400m Emerging Elite Champion.

Personal bests

All information taken from TFRRS profile.

References

External links
TFRRS profile for Robert Hovanec
DyeStat profile for Robert Hovanec
Milesplit Profile Robert Hovanec
UConn Huskies Bio

1993 births
Living people
American male sprinters
People from Storrs, Connecticut
Watchung Hills Regional High School alumni